The 1787 Rhode Island gubernatorial election was an election held on April 4, 1787 to elect the governor of Rhode Island. John Collins beat William Bradford with 72.24% of the vote.

General election

Candidates
John Collins, incumbent Governor since 1786.
William Bradford, Deputy Governor from 1775 to 1778.

Results

References

Rhode Island gubernatorial elections
1787 in Rhode Island